Ante Katalinić (11 February 1895 – 31 October 1981) was a Croatian rower who competed for Italy in the 1924 Summer Olympics.

In 1924, he won the bronze medal as crew member of the Italian boat in the eights competition with two brothers: Frane and Šimun, and Latino Galasso, Vittorio Gliubich, Giuseppe Crivelli, Petar Ivanov, Bruno Sorić, Carlo Toniatti.

References

External links
 
 
 
 
 

1895 births
1981 deaths
Italian male rowers
Croatian male rowers
Italian people of Croatian descent
Olympic rowers of Italy
Rowers at the 1924 Summer Olympics
Olympic bronze medalists for Italy
Sportspeople from Zadar
Olympic medalists in rowing
Medalists at the 1924 Summer Olympics
European Rowing Championships medalists